Poomala Chaal  is a small village situated about  from Chengannur in Alappuzha district, Kerala, India. Poomala Chaal is noted for its natural lotus lake and Malayil Palli (an ancient church founded by St. Gregorios of Parumala).

References

Villages in Alappuzha district